Michal Mertiňák and Petr Pála were the defending champions, but lost in the first round this year.

Xavier Malisse and Dick Norman won in the final 7–6(7–4), 7–6(7–4), against Rafael Nadal and Bartolomé Salvá-Vidal.

Seeds

Draw

Draw

External links
Draw

Doubles
Maharashtra Open